Regenesis or ReGenesis may refer to:

 Regeneration (biology), the resenesis of amputated or damaged cells, tissues or even organs.
 ReGenesis, a Canadian television series
 Regenesis (non-profit organization), an environmental group
 Regenesis (novel), by C. J. Cherryh
 ReGenesis (band), a Genesis tribute band
 X-Men: Regenesis, a Marvel Comics storyline
 Regenesis: How Synthetic Biology Will Reinvent Nature and Ourselves, a book by George M. Church
 Regenesis: Feeding the World Without Devouring the Planet, a 2022 book by George Monbiot